The 2012 Utah State Aggies football team represented Utah State University in the 2012 NCAA Division I FBS football season. The Aggies were led by fourth-year head coach Gary Andersen and played their home games at Merlin Olsen Field at Romney Stadium. This was the Aggies' final season as members of the Western Athletic Conference, winning the final WAC football title outright. They joined the Mountain West Conference on July 1, 2013 for the 2013 season.

Before the season

2012 recruits

Blue-White Spring Game presented by Orbit Irrigation Products
The Spring Game took place on April 28, 2012 featuring the squad divided into a blue team and a white team. It quickly became obvious that offense would rule the day. Despite injuries to running back Kerwynn Williams and receiver Matt Austin, the Aggies offense compiled 330 yards passing offense and 482 yards total offense over 75-plays. The Blue team would sneak away with a 58-57 win. However, the QB battle didn't become any clearer. Both Chuckie Keeton and Adam Kennedy would have outstanding days in the new Aggies spread offense. Keeton went 16-of-25 for 187 yards and two touchdowns. Kennedy responded by going 16-for-22 for 143 yards, 1 touchdown, and 1 interception.

Departures
27 lettermen, 14 offensively and 13 defensively, didn't return to the Aggies for the 2012 football season. Among those are the following players that were drafted or signed contracts into the NFL.

Draft

Roster

Depth chart

Schedule

Game summaries

Southern Utah

Sources:

Utah

Sources:

@ Wisconsin

Sources:

@ Colorado State

Sources:

UNLV

Sources:

@ BYU

Sources:

@ San Jose State

Sources:

New Mexico State

Sources:

@ UTSA

Sources:

Texas State

Sources:

@ Louisiana Tech

Sources:

Idaho

Sources:

Toledo (Famous Idaho Potato Bowl)

Sources:

References

Utah State
Utah State Aggies football seasons
Western Athletic Conference football champion seasons
Famous Idaho Potato Bowl champion seasons
Utah State Aggies football